Birger Hvirring Larsen (born Ole Hvirring Larsen on 27 March 1942) is a Danish former football player who spent his entire career with Boldklubben Frem. He played 12 games for the Denmark national football team, and participated in the 1964 European Championship. After finishing his career Larsen worked in insurance. He is now retired.

References

External links
Danish national team profile
 Boldklubben Frem profile

1942 births
Living people
Footballers from Copenhagen
Danish men's footballers
Boldklubben Frem players
Denmark international footballers
1964 European Nations' Cup players
Association football defenders